In Norse mythology, Nóatún (Old Norse "ship-enclosure") is the abode of the god Njörðr, described in the Prose Edda book Gylfaginning as located "in heaven".

Notes

References
Faulkes, Anthony (Trans.) (1995). Edda. Everyman. 
Orchard, Andy (1997). Dictionary of Norse Myth and Legend. Cassell. 

Locations in Norse mythology
Conceptions of heaven